No Tricks is the fourteenth and latest studio album by the Commodores, released on March 29, 1993. At this point, the band had been reduced to the trio of Walter "Clyde" Orange, William King and J.D. Nicholas. The album did not chart.

Track listing

References

Commodores albums
1993 albums